The Codex Gatianum, designated by gat or 30 (in Beuron system), is an 8th-century Latin manuscript of the New Testament. The text, written on vellum, is a version of the Old Latin.

Description 

The manuscript contains the text of the four Gospels.  The Latin text of the Gospels is a representative of the Old Latin version.

History 
Sabatier dated the manuscript to the 7th century, Kilkpatrick to the 8th century.  The text was published by Paul Sabatier and J. M. Heer in 1910.  It was examined by Heer and Love.

Currently it is housed at the National Library of France (fond lat. 1587) in Paris.

See also 

 List of New Testament Latin manuscripts
 Codex Sangermanensis I

References

Further reading 

 Joseph M. Heer, Evangelium Gatianum (Freiburg 1910).

External links 
  DER LATEINISCHE TEXT DES MATTHÄUSEVANGELIUMS DER MONSEER FRAGMENTE

Vetus Latina New Testament manuscripts
8th-century biblical manuscripts